Birger Wøllner Gaarn   (3 August 1881 – 10 August 1949) was a Danish organist, organ teacher and composer. He graduated from the Royal Danish Academy of Music in 1902, and was the organist at Christian's Church, Copenhagen from 1907 to 1949.

See also
List of Danish composers

References
This article was initially translated from the Danish Wikipedia.

Danish composers
Male composers
Danish classical organists
Male classical organists
1881 births
1949 deaths
20th-century organists
20th-century Danish male musicians